Colonel Óscar Alberto Mendoza Azurdia (4 June 1917 – 9 January 1995) was the chairman of the military junta in Guatemala from 24 October 1957 to 26 October 1957. He was later elected as Vice President on 12 September 1980 after the resignation of Francisco Villagrán. He served until the military coup of Efraín Ríos Montt in March 1982.

Military Government Junta (1957)
Colonel Óscar Mendoza Azurdia
Colonel Roberto Salazar
Colonel Gonzalo Yurrita Nova

References

Presidents of Guatemala
Vice presidents of Guatemala
People of the Guatemalan Civil War
Guatemalan generals
Leaders ousted by a coup
1917 births
1995 deaths